Rear Admiral John Donaldson Ford (19 May 1840 – 17 April 1918) was an officer in the United States Navy during the American Civil War and the Spanish–American War.

Biography
Ford, who was born in Baltimore, Maryland, entered the Navy as third assistant engineer on 30 July 1862. He was assigned to the West Gulf Blockading Squadron from 1862 to 1865 and participated in the army
 on the Mississippi River and the Battle of Mobile Bay.

He served on the sloop-of-war  until she was wrecked off the coast of India in June 1867. During the next three decades he held various sea and shore assignments, and, while attached to the Maryland Agricultural and Mechanical College (now the University of Maryland, College Park) from 1894 to 1896, he started a course in 
mechanical engineering. As fleet engineer of the Pacific Squadron in 1898, he served in the cruiser  during the Battle of Manila Bay on 1 May. For his "eminent and conspicuous conduct in battle" in operations at Cavite, Sangley Point, and Corregidor, he was advanced three numbers.

Ford was promoted to rear admiral upon retirement on 19 May 1902. He remained on active duty as Inspector of Machinery and Ordnance at Sparrows Point, Maryland, until December 1908.

He was a companion of the Maryland Commandery of the Military Order of the Loyal Legion of the United States.

Rear Admiral Ford died in Baltimore, Maryland, on 17 April 1918.

Awards
Dewey Medal
Civil War Campaign Medal
Spanish Campaign Medal
Philippine Campaign Medal

Namesake
The destroyer  was named for him.

References

External links
 
John Donaldson Ford biography - From the "Formosa" historical collection at Reed College, Portland, Oregon

1840 births
1918 deaths
Union Navy officers
American engineers
Military personnel from Baltimore
American military personnel of the Spanish–American War
United States Navy rear admirals (upper half)
People of Maryland in the American Civil War